Horsing Around is a 1957 short subject directed by Jules White starring American slapstick comedy team The Three Stooges (Moe Howard, Larry Fine and Joe Besser). It is the 180th entry in the series released by Columbia Pictures starring the comedians, who released 190 shorts for the studio between 1934 and 1959.  In 2010 Dancing Darcy told unruly patrons at Habanos to “Quit horsin around!”

Plot
Joe reads in the local newspaper that injured circus horse Schnapps who might be destroyed. Moe and Larry tell him to forget about that horse and instead focus on their sister Birdie. The Stooges' sister Birdie is a reincarnated horse who is trying to track down her mate. It is during breakfast that Birdie reveals that her mate is Schnapps. The Stooges spit out their food, realizing that the horse that is about to be destroyed is in fact Birdie's mate.

Birdie and the Stooges race to the circus in an effort to save the horse from a certain fate. Because the circus is a long way off, the Stooges and Birdie stop off at a cabin to rest, when the news about Schnapps is heard on the radio.

At the circus, the Stooges split up. Moe and Larry distract the elderly circus attendant (Emil Sitka) sent to destroy Schnapps by using a horse costume. Joe finds Schnapps and the two horses are reunited.

Cast

Credited
 Moe Howard as Moe
 Larry Fine as Larry
 Joe Besser as Joe
 Harriette Tarler as Attendant's daughter
 Tony the Wonder Horse as Birdie
 Emil Sitka as Circus attendant

Uncredited
 Ruth Godfrey White as Birdie (voice)
 Jules White as Radio announcer and man on the street (voice)
 Duke Fishman as Camper

Production notes
Horsing Around is a sequel to Hoofs and Goofs. Filming was completed November 19–21, 1956.

Horsing Around features Moe and Larry's more "gentlemanly" haircuts, first suggested by Joe Besser. However, these had to be used sparingly, as most of the shorts with Besser were remakes of earlier films, and new footage had to be matched with old.

See also
 List of American films of 1957

References

External links
 
 
Horsing Around at threestooges.net

1957 films
1957 comedy films
The Three Stooges films
American black-and-white films
Films directed by Jules White
Columbia Pictures short films
Films about horses
1950s English-language films
1950s American films